Lodovico Agostini (1534 – 20 September 1590) was an Italian composer, singer, priest, and scholar of the late Renaissance. He was a close associate of the  Ferrara Estense court, and one of the most skilled representatives of the progressive secular style which developed there at the end of the 16th century.

Life 
He was born in Ferrara, and spent most of his life there.  He was the illegitimate son of Agostino Agostini, a singer and priest of Ferrara mostly active in the 1540s. Lodovico may have studied for a time in  Rome, based on the evidence of a madrigal published there, and he became a priest. By 1572, he was singing in the chapel of Ferrara Cathedral, and by 1578 he was on the payroll of Duke Alfonso II d'Este, one of the most famous patrons of music of the late 16th century. Clearly Lodovico was a favorite of the Duke, and he remained in his service for the rest of his life.

In the 1580s, he was a composition teacher to the Duke of Mantua, Guglielmo Gonzaga; Agostini dedicated a book of madrigals to him.  Gonzaga went on to become a composer of madrigals himself, and in addition was a close associate of Palestrina.

Agostini was on good terms with many members of the aristocracy, as well as the famous poets Tasso and Guarini, and other musicians at the court, including Luzzasco Luzzaschi, the most famous of the Ferrarese madrigalists.

While retaining his association with the intensely secular Estense court, he also had a distinguished ecclesiastical career, eventually becoming a Monsignore and an apostolic protonotary.

Music and influence 

Ferrara, in the 1580s and 1590s, was one of the most musically advanced and sophisticated places in Europe.  Under the patronage of Duke Alfonso II d'Este the court developed into a place of musical experimentation, with a group of virtuoso female singers (the concerto di donne) available to an equally virtuoso group of composers, who included Luzzaschi, Agostini, and in the 1590s, Carlo Gesualdo.  They all wrote music for the enjoyment of a small group of connoisseurs, including the Duke himself.  In this rarefied atmosphere an avant-garde style of music flourished, and Agostini was one of the most musically daring of the group.  In some ways the scene at Ferrara was reminiscent of the activity at Avignon in the late 14th century, which produced a musical style known as the ars subtilior; indeed the Ferrarese scene is reminiscent of certain 20th and 21st century movements.

Agostini was fond of musical enigmas, puzzles, surprise and double-entendre, and his many musical collections display this.  Enigmi musicali and L'echo, et enigmi musicali are canons to be solved by riddles, full of unusual chromatic progressions, instrumental interpolations, and other musical curiosities.  Some of his books of madrigals are written in a virtuoso singing style obviously intended for the three current members of the concerto di donne (Laura Peverara, Anna Guarini, and Livia d'Arco).  His third book of madrigals, for six voices (1582), appears to be the earliest collection of the actual repertory of this ensemble.

Agostini was also a composer of accompanied solo song; since many of the performers at the court were instrumentalists in addition to singers (for example Livia d'Arco was a virtuoso player of the viol) he wrote for both lute and viol as accompaniment to solo singers.

While no liturgical music by Agostini has survived (none may have been written), one of his last compositions is Le lagrime del peccatore, a setting of poems by Luigi Tansillo, as a set of madrigali spirituali; it is similar in intent, if not in musical means, to the set Lagrime di San Pietro by Orlando di Lasso, also based on poems by Tansillo.

Agostini died in 1590, and in 1598 Alfonso died and Ferrara was absorbed into the Papal States, effectively ending the musical experimentation there.

References and further reading

External links 
 Dangerous Graces:  Female musicians at the courts of Ferrara and Parma, 1565-1589 Contains biographies of Agostino and Luzzaschi, as well as extensive information on the members of the concerto di donne.
 

1534 births
1590 deaths
Musicians from Ferrara
Italian classical composers
Italian male classical composers
Renaissance composers
Italian male singers
16th-century Italian musicians